Anostoma tessa is a species of air-breathing land snail, a terrestrial pulmonate gastropod mollusc in the family Odontostomidae.

Distribution 
This species occurs in Bahia state, Brazil.

References

Odontostomidae
Gastropods described in 2012